The Borovo Treasure, also known as the Borovo Silver Treasure, is a Thracian hoard of five matching silver-gilt items discovered in late 1974 while ploughing a field in Borovo, Bulgaria.

The treasure is kept in the history museum at Ruse.

Items
The treasure consists of a table set of five silver-gilt items:
Three rhyta, each a different size, and with a different base. The largest has a figure of a sphinx and bears the inscription: "[Belongs to] Cotys from [the town of] Beos.", as well as the name of the craftsman, Etbeos. The second has a figure of a horse, and the third, the smallest, has a bull. Each are half figures.
A large, two-handled bowl: This item is decorated with a relief of a deer being attacked by a griffin.
A rhyta jug with images gods at a feast, scenes showing the mythological cycles, with images of Dionysus and Heracles, satyrs, griffons, and sphinxes.

Discovery
The discovery was made while ploughing a field approximately 2 km from the village of Borovo, Ruse, in Bulgaria. Unfortunately, the plow severely damaged objects, but after extensive restoration work, the damage is nearly invisible.

It is unknown why the treasure was buried at that particular site, since no tumulus was found at the location.

Origins
The inscription on the sphinx rhyta indicates that the treasure may have been a gift to a local Getic ruler from the king Cotys I (382-359 BC), who reigned in the Odrysian Kingdom from 383 to 359 BC. It is for this reason that the treasure is considered to be from the early to mid fourth century BC.

Gallery

See also
Persian-Sassanid art patterns
Thraco-Cimmerian
Treasure of Nagyszentmiklós
Zoomorphic style

Other Thracian treasures:
Panagyurishte Treasure
Rogozen Treasure
Valchitran Treasure
Lukovit Treasure

References

Further reading
 via- Met Publications

Treasure troves in Bulgaria
Thracian archaeological artifacts
Treasure troves of classical antiquity
1974 archaeological discoveries
4th-century BC artefacts
Ancient Greek metalwork
Silver objects
History of Ruse Province
Odrysian kingdom